Peak Performance, known in Japan as , is a 1997 video game developed by Cave and published by Atlus and JVC Music Europe for the PlayStation.

Reception

The game received average reviews according to the review aggregation website GameRankings. Next Generation said, "In the end, PPs racing weighs in at just above average. But with many unique options, including a 'create-your-own obstacle course,' Peak Performance should be enough to entice drivers looking for a 'different' racer as opposed to an improved version of 'more of the same.'" In Japan, Famitsu gave it a score of 27 out of 40.

Notes

References

External links
 

1997 video games
Atlus games
Cave (company) games
PlayStation (console) games
PlayStation Network games
Racing video games
Video games developed in Japan
Video games scored by Toshiaki Tomizawa